The sit-up (or curl-up) is an abdominal endurance training exercise to strengthen, tighten and tone the abdominal muscles. It is similar to a crunch (crunches target the rectus abdominis and also work the external and internal obliques), but sit-ups have a fuller range of motion and condition additional muscles.

Form
It begins with lying with the back on the floor, typically with the arms across the chest or hands behind the head and the knees and toes bent in an attempt to reduce stress on the back muscles and spine, and then elevating both the upper and lower vertebrae from the floor until everything superior to the buttocks is not touching the ground. Some argue that situps can be dangerous due to high compressive lumbar load and may be replaced with the crunch in exercise programs. Performing alternative abdominal exercises to sit-ups actually increases the ability to do sit-ups.

Performing sit-ups do not cause the spot reduction of fat at the waist. 
Gaining a "six pack" requires both abdominal muscle hypertrophy training and fat loss over the abdomen—which can only be done by losing fat from the body as a whole.

Variations

The movement can be made easier by placing the arms further down away from the head. Typical variations to this include crossing the arms to place the palms on the front of the shoulders and extending the arms down to the sides with palms on the floor. The 'arms on shoulders' variation is also used to make the incline sit-up easier.

More intense movement is achieved by doing weighted sit-ups, incline sit-ups with arms behind neck and even harder by doing the weighted incline sit-up.

Health risks
With improper form, full sit-ups may cause back pain and arching of the lower back, increasing the risk of back injury.

Since the 2010s, every branch of the U.S. armed forces have begun to phase out sit-ups, due to the high rates of lower-back injury.

See also

Crunch (exercise)
Plank (exercise)
Squat (exercise)

References

Bodyweight exercises
Aerobic exercise